Kahekili may refer to:
Kahekili I, early king of Maui
Kahekili II (c. 1737–1794), king of the island of Maui and Oahu
George Cox Kahekili Keeaumoku II (1784–1824), a Hawaiian high chief and royal governor of Maui during the early period of the Kingdom of Hawaii
Kaukuna Kahekili, a Hawaiian high chief during the early period of the Kingdom of Hawaii
Kahekili Highway is a 35-mile road on West Maui, Hawaii